David Alexander Gordon (January 18, 1858 – March 9, 1919) was a Canadian politician.

Political career
Born in Wallaceburg, Canada West, the son of Aaron Gordon, Scotch, and Jane Steinchoff, German, Gordon educated at the Public Schools in Wallaceburg. A manufacturer, he was a town councillor and mayor of Wallaceburg from 1898 to 1900. He was an unsuccessful candidate for the House of Commons of Canada for the electoral district of Bothwell at the general elections of 1900. He was elected in 1904 for the electoral district of Kent East. A Liberal, he was re-elected in 1908 and 1911.

His son Arthur St. Clair Gordon later served as an Ontario cabinet minister.

Business career
Although D.A. Gordon had a successful regional and national political career he is known locally as the "Father of Modern Wallaceburg".  He was most likely given this title for his work in establishing four of Wallaceburg's most successful industries: Wallaceburg Cooperage Company (1887), Sydenham Glass Company (1894),  Canada and Dominion Sugar Company (1901), and the Wallaceburg Brass & Iron Limited Company (1905). He played various leadership roles in starting the aforementioned businesses, however,  his ability to raise investment funds was invaluable.

References
 
 The Canadian Parliament; biographical sketches and photo-engravures of the senators and members of the House of Commons of Canada. Being the tenth Parliament, elected November 3, 1904

1858 births
1919 deaths
Liberal Party of Canada MPs
Mayors of places in Ontario
Members of the House of Commons of Canada from Ontario
People from Chatham-Kent